Martin's may refer to:

Places
 Martin's Additions, Maryland, USA
 Martin's Battery, Gibraltar
 Martin's Beach, California, USA
 Martin's Brandon Church, Virginia, USA
 Martin's Brook, Nova Scotia, Canada
 Martin's Cave, Gibraltar
 Martin's Church, Copenhagen, Denmark
 Martin's Church, Turku, Finland
 Martin's Cove, Wyoming, USA
 Martin's Evangelical Church, South Dakota, USA
 Martin's Fork (Cumberland River tributary), Kentucky, USA
 Martin's Haven, Wales, UK
 Martin's Hundred, early 17th-century plantation in Virginia, USA
 Martin's Location, New Hampshire, USA
 Martin's Mill, Texas, USA
 Martin's Mill Independent School District, Texas, USA
 Martin's Mill Junior/Senior High School, Texas, USA
 Martin's Mills, Tennessee, USA
 Martin's Point, North Carolina, USA
 Martin's River, Nova Scotia, Canada
 Martin's Tavern, Washington DC, USA

Companies
 Martin's (New York), specialty apparel retailer, New York, USA
 Martin's (Newsagent), UK
 Martin's BBQ, Puerto Rican cuisine fast food restaurant chain
 Martin's Famous Pastry Shoppe, Pennsylvania, USA
 Martin's Food Markets, grocery chain operated by Giant-Carlisle
 Martin's Potato Chips, USA
 Martin's Super Markets, grocery chain headquartered in South Bend, Indiana, USA

Science
 Martin's Axiom, mathematical axiom
 Martin's bent-toed gecko (Cyrtodactylus martini)
 Martin's blue (Kretania martini), North African butterfly
 Martin's desert racer (Mesalina martini), species of sand-dwelling lizard
 Martin's false sergeant (Pseudathyma martini), African butterfly
 Martin's lichen moth (Cisthene martini)
 Martin's spurge (Euphorbia × martini), hybrid flowering plant
 Martin's sulfurane, organosulfur compound
 Martin's toadlet (Uperoleia martini), Australian frog

Media
 Martin's Close, 1911 ghost story by British writer M. R. James
 Martin's Day, 1985 American drama film
 Martin's Lie, 1964 chamber opera by Gian Carlo Menotti

Other
 Martin's cruise of 1794, French naval operation
 Martin's Light Railways, India

See also
 Martin (disambiguation)
 Martins (disambiguation)
 Martin's Mill Covered Bridge (disambiguation)
 St. Martin's (disambiguation)